Guy Dill (born May 30, 1946) is an American sculptor noted for his monumental bronze and marble abstractions. His work is included in international collections at the Solomon R. Guggenheim Museum, the Museum of Modern Art, and the Stedelijk Museum. Dill lives in Los Angeles, California.

References 

Guy Dill, A Decade, Katzen American University Museum, College of Arts & Sciences], 2006

External links
Official website

American sculptors
1946 births
Living people